LNH Division 1, doing business as Starligue and currently known as Liqui Moly Starligue for sponsorship reasons, is the premier men's professional handball league in France. It is administered by the Ligue Nationale de Handball, under delegation from the French Handball Federation. Founded in 1952, it is currently contested by 16 teams.

Montpellier Handball is the most successful club with 14 titles, and the club which won the most consecutive titles is Paris Saint-Germain with 8 between 2015 and 2022.

The champion and the vice-champion are directly qualified for the group phase of the EHF Champions League. The winners of the Coupe de France and the Coupe de la Ligue are qualified for the European League. If the winner of (one of) these cups is also the champion, the place(s) are attributed in terms of the Division 1 ranking.

Since 2016, the league has had a title sponsor. Discount retail chain Lidl was the first, paying €1 million per season for the rights (with the exception of the final season, a short term extension signed during the COVID-19 crisis). It was succeeded in 2021 by lubricant manufacturer Liqui Moly.

Clubs

2022–23 Teams 

2020-21 Teams

Results:

  US Ivry & Tremblay Handball
  Saran Loiret HB & Grand Nancy MHB
 
2021-22 Teams

Results:

  Saran Loiret HB & Grand Nancy MHB
  US Ivry & Sélestat Alsace HB

Winners

Performance by club

Statistics

EHF coefficients

The following data indicates French coefficient rankings between European handball leagues.

Country ranking
EHF League Ranking for 2022/23 season:

1.  (1)  Handball-Bundesliga (145.00)
2.  (3)  Liga ASOBAL (121.50)
3.  (2)  LNH Division 1 (104.33)
4.  (5)  Nemzeti Bajnokság I (94.17)
5.  (7)  Håndboldligaen (87.33)

Club ranking
EHF Club Ranking as of 14 December 2022:

 4.  Paris Saint-Germain (540)
 7.  Montpellier (447)
 11.  HBC Nantes (385)
 28.  USAM Nîmes (175)
 29.  Fenix Toulouse (172)

See also

 Other domestic competitions:
 Coupe de France
 Coupe de la Ligue
 Trophée des Champions
 Handball in France:
 LNH Division 2 (ProLigue), lower echelon of France handball
 LFH Division 1 Féminine (Ligue Butagaz Énergie), the corresponding women's competition
 LFH Division 2 Féminine (D2F)
 List of handball clubs in France

References

External links 
Official website

1
Professional sports leagues in France